June Hunt (born Ruth June Hunt, December 31, 1944) is Founder and CSO (Chief Servant Officer) of Hope for the Heart, the nonprofit Christian ministry she founded in 1986.

Hunt is the author of the Biblical Counseling Library, a 100-volume collection of topical, Biblical counseling manuals, that serves as the foundation for Hope for the Heart's international broadcasts, training, publishing, teaching and biblical counseling ministry. Hunt has two radio broadcasts—Hope in the Night, a live 2-hour call-in counseling program, and Hope for the Heart, a half-hour teaching program.

Early years
Hunt was born as daughter of H. L. Hunt and Ruth Ray. She grew up in Dallas, where Hunt attended the Hockaday School. Hunt then graduated from Southern Methodist University in 1966 with a Bachelor of Music degree, and later earned a Master of Arts degree in Counseling from Criswell College.

Career 
Hunt initially worked as Junior High Division Director, and later as College & Career Director, at First Baptist Church in Dallas, Texas, overseeing the spiritual formation of 1,200 members combined. 

As a part of this role, Hunt created curriculum for a multi-year Bible survey course. Between 1989 and 1992, she developed and taught Counseling Through The Bible, a scripturally-based counseling course, which addressed 100 topics in categories such as marriage and family, rocky relationships, emotional entrapments, Christian apologetics, as well as addictions and abuse. Since then, the coursework has been refined to form the basis for the Biblical Counseling Library, composed of 100 topical training manuals, each called Biblical Counseling Keys.

The Counseling Library has served as the foundation of the ministry's expansion, including the 2002 creation of the Hope Biblical Counseling Institute (BCI). Initiated by Dallas' Criswell College, the Institute equips spiritual leaders, counselors, and other caring people to find solutions for emotional, relational and spiritual problems.

During this time, Hunt also appeared as a guest on numerous national TV and radio programs, including NBC's Today Show. She also toured overseas with the USO and was a guest soloist with the Billy Graham Crusades.

Hope for the Heart
Hope for the Heart'''s Biblical Counseling Library provides a foundation for Hunt's two daily radio programs, Hope for the Heart and Hope in the Night. Hope for the Heart is a half-hour of interactive teaching. Hope in the Night is a live two-hour call-in counseling program. Together, the programs air worldwide on nearly 900 radio outlets.

T Biblical Counseling Keys have been published in more than 30 languages in more than 60 countries. 

HOPE-sponsored walk-in counseling centers operate internationally. In Canada, the ministry aired a Chinese language version of HOPE's radio briefs, Moment of Hope, and sponsors a call center through which Chinese-speaking listeners receive biblical counsel.

In 2008, Hope for the Heart created a new Chair of Biblical Counseling at Criswell College. The Biblical Counseling Library is required curriculum for counseling students enrolled in this program.

Recent Updates
Hunt is the founder and CEO of The Hope Center in Plano, Texas, a permanent home for nearly 50 nonprofit Christian ministries that share space under one roof. Hope for the Heart is the Center's anchor tenant and offers walk-in counseling by appointment at the Center.

Hunt has been a regular guest professor at colleges and seminaries. She trains peers annually at the American Association of Christian Counselors conference and speaks at numerous other national and international conferences, as well as religious and broadcasting events each year on topics such as forgiveness, anger, fear, childhood sexual abuse, and domestic violence.

In 2011, her article "Beyond Cancer: A Survivor’s Story”, appeared in the Vol. 18 No. 1 issue of the American Association of Christian Counseling magazine Christian Counseling Today.

Awards and honors
 National Religious Broadcasters (NRB) 
1986: Hope for the Heart radio broadcast, Genesis Award, "Best New Radio Program" 
1989: Hope for the Heart radio broadcast, "Radio Program of the Year" 
2010: Hope for the Heart ministry, "Media Award for International Strategic Partnerships”
2011: June Hunt, "board of directors Award”
2012: Hope for the Heart ministry, "Radio Impact Award”

 Others 
1991: June Hunt, honorary Doctor of Law degree, Criswell College
1993: June Hunt, honorary Doctorate in Literature, Dallas Baptist University
2002: Selected Biblical Counseling Keys'', translated into Russian, "Best Inspirational Book of the Year"
2008: June Hunt, "Excellence in Communications Award," Women in Christian Media
2008: June Hunt, "Reintegration Award", Eli Lilly
2011: June Hunt, "Caregiver Award", American Association of Christian Counselors
2012: Advanced Writers & Speakers Association, "Golden Scroll Lifetime Achievement Award"

Selected works

Trade books 
Aging Well: Living Long, Finishing Strong
The Answer to Anger, Practical Steps to Temper Fiery Emotions, 
The Biblical Counseling Reference Guide: Over 580 Real-Life Topics, More than 11,000 Relevant Verses, 
Bonding with Your Child through Boundaries, 
Bonding with Your Teen through Boundaries, 
Boundaries: How to Set Them-How to Keep Them, 
Bullying: Bully No More, 
Caregiving: a Privilege, Not a Prison, 
Caring for a Loved One with Cancer, 
Counseling Through Your Bible Handbook, 
Dealing with Anger Bible Study, 
Envy & Jealousy: Taming the Terrible Twins, 
Finding Self-Worth Bible Study, 
Handling Stress Bible Study, 
Hope For Your Heart: Finding Strength in Life’s Storms, 
How to Defeat Harmful Habits: Freedom from Six Addictive Behaviors, 
How to Deal with Difficult Relationships: Bridging the Gaps That Separate People, 
How to Forgive ... When You Don't Feel Like It, 
How to Handle Your Emotions, 
How to Rise Above Abuse, 
Keeping Your Cool … When Your Anger Is Hot!, 
Men's Trail Guide, 
Overcoming Depression Bible Study, 
Seeing Yourself Through God's Eyes, 
Understanding Verbal & Emotional Abuse Bible Study,

Music CDs 
Songs of Surrender
Hymns of Hope
The Whisper of My Heart
The Shelter Under His Wings
The Hope of Christmas

References

External links

Hope For The Heart
June Hunt on Facebook
June Hunt on Twitter

American Christian writers
American radio personalities
American evangelicals
Criswell College alumni
Hunt family
Living people
People from Dallas
1944 births
Writers from Texas
Hockaday School alumni